North Church, is an early 10th-century Alanian church located in Arkhyz, a mountainous region of Karachay-Cherkessia.

History 
North Church served as the Cathedral of the Alanian Empire during the 10th -13th centuries. The church was constructed using sandstone. The plan has the shape of a cross. The length of the church without narthex is 21 meters.

Some of the frescoes of the late 19th century were painted by DM Strukov. Fragments of ancient plaster, already without the paint layer, have been preserved during the restoration of the walls of the church. According to v. a. Kuznetsov North Church was perhaps constructed from 914 to 916 and was dedicated to St. Nicholas the miracle worker. Inside the church are an ancient baptistery, altar, and cemetery near the south wall.

See also 
Zelenchuksky Churches
Senty Church
Shoana Church

History of Karachay-Cherkessia
Churches in Karachay-Cherkessia
10th-century churches in Russia
Medieval Eastern Orthodox church buildings in Russia
Eastern Orthodox cathedrals